"Uncut Femmes" is the 17th episode of the thirty-second season of the American animated television series The Simpsons, and the 701st episode overall. It aired in the United States on Fox on March 28, 2021. The episode was directed by Chris Clements, and written by Christine Nangle. In this episode, Marge participates in a jewel heist, and Chief Wiggum's wife Sarah receives a retcon and voice change for this episode as being an ex-criminal.

The episode was watched live in the United States by 1.22 million viewers.

Plot
After discovering something terrible in the nuclear power plant, Waylon Smithers bribes Carl to keep what he has found quiet by giving him tickets to a Bob Seger concert. He invites Homer to join him, and he leaves Marge to chaperone a field trip on a World War II battleship, to her dismay.

At the field trip, Marge pairs up with the seemingly-boring Sarah Wiggum. After the latter sneakily tricks the children into going to bed early, Marge realizes that Sarah is not who she seems and is hiding her mean spirited boisterous and bratty personality from the other mothers. The two are soon kidnapped after spending all night together, and Marge and Sarah find themselves in the lair of two women that Sarah surprisingly used to thrive with; Sarah was the team's "honeypot" who seduced men to distract them from their heists.

The other burglars, Erin and Bette, explain how, while they and Sarah were heisting a museum where Chief Clancy Wiggum was on duty, the fourth member of their team - Lindsay Naegle - betrayed them and had them arrested. However, Sarah was spared the fate due to falling in love and having slept with Wiggum. The women plot to steal the Hourglass Diamond from their betrayer, who is attending the prestigious Gen Gala. Marge turns out to be useful in the planning, pointing out that most of the entrances will be blocked by celebrities, fans and the paparazzi and they will need stylish costumes to blend in, so they recruit her for the heist.

Meanwhile, Homer and Wiggum run into each other at the concert, where Seger scolds them for breaking their promises to their wives. Feeling remorseful, they return to the battleship only to learn of the kidnapping, with Ralph as the sole witness. Wiggum and Homer confront Fat Tony, accusing him of kidnapping their wives, but he denies doing so and also suggests that the two's disappearance may have something to do with their husbands' selfishness and absentmindedness. Leaving Ralph in Fat Tony's temporary care, Wiggum and Homer search for their wives while realizing that they do not know them very well, but then see Marge and Sarah attending the gala on TV.

The four women execute the heist perfectly until Naegle realizes she has been robbed and calls the police. As Marge and Sarah attempt to flee, Homer and Wiggum call out to their wives via a megaphone to apologize. Attempting to quiet Wiggum's loud calls for her name, Sarah tackles him to the ground, thus revealing her real personality to a surprised Wiggum. While attempting to stop Marge and Sarah herself, Naegle ends up tumbling down the long amount of stairs and is exposed by Erin and Bette and arrested for stealing other women's jewelry, allowing Marge and Sarah to escape publicly with the jewel, much to the surprise of Patty and Selma and their friends who are watching the gala back at the Simpson house.

During the credits, Wiggum and Sarah have sex at the gala after she tells him the full history of her past. Wiggum then realizes that he forgot about Ralph, who is still bonding with Fat Tony in father-son activities.

Production

Casting
Nick Offerman guest-stars as Captain Bowditch, Megan Mullally guest-stars as Sarah Wiggum (who is normally voiced by Pamela Hayden), Joe Mantegna as Fat Tony, Natasha Rothwell as Bette, Bob Seger as himself, and Tiya Sircar as Erin. In addition, Dawnn Lewis becomes the new voice of Bernice Hibbert while Tony Rodriguez voices Julio in this episode after his singing voice was previously done by Mario Jose in "Diary Queen".

Reception

Viewing figures
In the United States, the episode was watched live by 1.22 million viewers.

Critical response
Tony Sokol with Den of Geek said, "Uncut Femmes' is a fun and playful movie satire. It captures the suspense, romance, glamour and pace of a heist film, but puts The Simpsons touch on it. Marge shines in the unexpected, manages to clean house at the same time, and brings Homer into an understanding. The crooks get away with it, and nothing will change. Like so many crimes in Springfield, it’s got Chief Wiggum on the case, and that’s like having no one at all." He also gave the episode four out of five stars.

Retconned continuity
In a series of since-deleted tweets answering fans' questions, show runner Matt Selman addressed both the change in Sarah Wiggum's personality and the use of guest star Megan Mullally instead of regular performer Pamela Hayden. He also explained his view of one-off episodes as well as continuity for The Simpsons in general, in an interview with IGN, stating "We're not saying this is the official continuity now, and none of that other stuff happened. We're just saying in this one episode, this is a silly way to present the character’s life. It doesn't mean that the people's beloved episodes from the past didn't happen. They all kind of happened in their imaginary world, you know, and people can choose to love whichever version they love."

References

External links
 

The Simpsons (season 32) episodes
2021 American television episodes
Television episodes about theft
Television episodes about abduction